Patrick O'Hara (born September 27, 1968) is an American football coach and former quarterback who is the Pass game analyst for the Tennessee Titans of the National Football League (NFL). He previously served as the head coach of the New Orleans VooDoo, Orlando Predators and Tri-Cities Fever. O'Hara also served as an assistant coach for the Houston Texans and Tampa Bay Storm. 

O'Hara played college football as a quarterback at USC and was drafted by the Tampa Bay Buccaneers in the 10th round (260th overall) of the 1991 NFL Draft.

In his 16-year playing career, O'Hara has also played for the Ohio Glory, San Diego Chargers, Washington Redskins, Orlando Predators, Toronto Phantoms and Tampa Bay Storm, and played backup quarterback Tyler Cherubini in Oliver Stone's 1999 film Any Given Sunday. Over the span of his AFL career, he played in five ArenaBowls, winning three. In 2005, he was named offensive coordinator of the Storm, becoming a player-coach. Then, in 2007, after retiring as a player, he resumed the duties of offensive coordinator. After the 2008 season, on July 25, 2008, he agreed to a three-year deal, with an option for a fourth, with the Los Angeles Avengers to become the fourth head coach in the franchises history. However, the Avengers folded when the AFL went on hiatus.

High school career
O'Hara attended Santa Monica High School, where during junior and senior seasons he threw at least one touchdown pass a game. He was a two-time Los Angeles Times All-Westside selection and the "Westside Back of the Year" in 1984 and 1985.

As a junior, in 1984, O'Hara passed for nearly 2,000 yards and 23 touchdowns. During his senior season, he passed for nearly 2,000 yards and 21 touchdowns in 10 games which earned him "Bay League Player of the Year" honors and selection to the Long Beach Press-Telegram'''s "Best in the West" team.

College career
O'Hara then attended USC where his playing time was limited to being a backup. As a sophomore in 1988, he served as the backup to Rodney Peete, who finished the season as a Heisman Trophy finalist.

O'Hara was expected to be the Trojans' starting quarterback in 1989, but suffered two torn ligaments in his right knee and a fractured right tibia in practice 10 days before the start of the season. The injuries required multiple surgeries, including one to graft bone from his hip. He was hospitalized for three weeks, a time in which he lost 35 pounds and received a get-well letter from former president Ronald Reagan.

As a senior in 1990, O'Hara served as backup to Todd Marinovich. Marinovich, then a freshman, was given the starting job and helped lead the team to a Rose Bowl win against Michigan in Bo Schembechler's last game as a head coach. O'Hara's arm was impressive enough for some NFL scouts to offer him a workout with them. He graduated with a degree in Public Administration in 1991.

Professional playing career

National Football League
O'Hara was selected in the 10th round (260th overall) of the 1991 NFL Draft by the Tampa Bay Buccaneers. He spent the first 11 weeks on the teams practice squad before being activated and serving as the team third-string quarterback the remainder of the season.
O’Hara holds the unique distinction as the only quarterback selected in modern draft history without ever being a starter in a collegiate game.

Following the 1991 season O'Hara was allocated to the World League of American Football's Ohio Glory and subsequently signed by the San Diego Chargers as a Plan B free agent serving as their third-string quarterback for the 1992 season. He then attended training camp with the Chargers in 1993 and the Washington Redskins in 1994.

Arena Football League
O'Hara joined the Arena Football League in 1995 season when he signed with the Orlando Predators. He played there for six seasons helping to lead the Predators to wins in ArenaBowls XII and XIV. He then joined the Toronto Phantoms in 2001 and then the Tampa Bay Storm in 2003. He helped lead the Storm to a win in ArenaBowl XVII after starting Quarterback John Kaleo was injured late in the second quarter. In his playing career, O'Hara played in a total of five ArenaBowls and won three.

Coaching career
O’Hara began his coaching career at Point Loma High School in 1996, working with the Quarterbacks as a volunteer assistant. He later spent three seasons (1998–2000) as an assistant coach at New Smyrna Beach High School and three seasons (2001–03) as the offensive coordinator at Olympia High School where he coached NFL running back Chris Johnson.

In 2005, O'Hara was named offensive coordinator of the Storm, becoming a player-coach. Then after the 2006 season, he retired as a player, he resumed the duties of offensive coordinator. His success on the field as a player and as a coordinator had a number of teams interested in him in the 2008 offseason. He interviewed for head coaching positions with the Grand Rapids Rampage and the Arizona Rattlers and was a finalist for both jobs. However, On July 25, 2008, he agreed to a three-year deal, with an option for a fourth, with the Los Angeles Avengers to become the fourth head coach in the franchise's history. However, the AFL cancelled its 2009 season, and on April 27, 2009, he was hired as the replacement of Richard Davis as head coach of the Tri-Cities Fever of af2.

The Fever went 3–8 after hiring O'Hara, finishing 3–13. Although the team invited him to remain on as head coach in 2010, he decided to take an offer to become head coach of the Orlando Predators in the Arena Football League on December 21, 2009.

On August 8, 2011, he was named the head coach of the New Orleans VooDoo. Following the 2015 AFL season the VooDoo ceased operations.

On February 3, 2015, O'Hara was named an offensive assistant coach for the Houston Texans.

On January 26, 2018, O'Hara was hired as the quarterbacks coach for the Tennessee Titans.

Broadcasting career
(2010–2014) O'Hara worked as a television football analyst for Bright House (Spectrum) Sports Network covering Florida high school football. O'Hara also served as color analyst for UCF Img Radio Network covering UCF football (2013–2014). More recently, O'Hara has worked as a color analyst for CBS Sports Network covering the Arena Football League (AFL).

Movie career
O’Hara's previous off-seasons have included consulting work, coordinating and choreographing football action scenes in movies. He also has coached actors such as Adam Sandler, Mark Wahlberg and Dwayne Johnson to better help them portray their characters. In addition, O'Hara has appeared in several movies including The Waterboy, Any Given Sunday, and The Game Plan''.

References

External links
 Pat O'Hara at ArenaFan
 

1968 births
Living people
American football quarterbacks
Arena Football League executives
Houston Texans coaches
Los Angeles Avengers coaches
New Orleans VooDoo coaches
Ohio Glory players
Orlando Predators coaches
Orlando Predators players
San Diego Chargers players
Tampa Bay Buccaneers players
Tampa Bay Storm coaches
Tampa Bay Storm players
Tri-Cities Fever coaches
Toronto Phantoms players
USC Trojans football players
High school football coaches in California
High school football coaches in Florida
Players of American football from Santa Monica, California
Tennessee Titans coaches